Nairobi Affair is a 1984 made-for-television action film starring Charlton Heston, Maud Adams and John Savage. It was directed by Marvin J. Chomsky and written by David Epstein.

References

External links

1984 films
1984 action films

Films directed by Marvin J. Chomsky